Viki was the subject of one of the first experiments in ape language. Viki was raised by Keith and Catherine Hayes in the same manner as a human infant, to see if she could learn human words. She was given speech therapy, which involved the Hayeses (her adopters) manipulating her lower jaw. Eventually, she was able to voice four words:
mama
papa
up
cup

This extremely limited success was at first interpreted as evidence that apes were not capable of using human language. However, further experiments in which chimpanzees were instructed in the use of American sign language indicated that Viki's achievements had been significantly hampered by physiological limitations—chimpanzees are not able to produce the sounds that make up human speech. Viki lived like a human, even with a human sibling, for three years with her trainers, Keith and Cathy Hayes, with the notion that the other failed attempts of teaching a non-human primate a human language failed because these studies used environments too dissimilar to a human's environment when infants learn language. The immersive language experienced failed, however, after three years Cathy Hays said “the only obvious and important deficit in the ape’s innate intelligence, as compared with man’s, is a missing facility for using and understanding language” (Fitch, 2002). The faculty argument is common in the field of evolutionary linguistics and biolinguistics. Noam Chomsky called it a "language acquisition device" innate to humans which allows for our use of the matured "language organ" or faculty (See Hauser, Chomsky, & Fitch, 2002). Chomsky, conceding that language has share components across multiple species and domains, now uses the terms "Broad" and "Narrow," Narrow being the only human trait of discrete infinity.

See also
 List of individual apes

References
 Catherine Hayes (1951), The Ape in Our House. New York: Harper.
 K.J. Hayes  and C Hayes, C (1952). "Imitation in a home-raised chimpanzee". Journal of Comparative and Physiological Psychology, 45, 450–459.
 K.J. Hayes  and C.H. Nissen. (1971). "Higher mental functions of a home-raised chimpanzee". In Schrier, A.M. and Stollnitz, F. (eds). Behaviour of Non-human Primates, 4,50-115. New York, Academic Press.
Hauser, Chomsky, & Fitch. (2002). The Faculty of Language: what is it, who has it, and how did it evolve? Science (298)5598, pp. 1569–1579. DOI: 10.1126/science.298.5598.1569

Apes from language studies
Individual chimpanzees
Talking animals